LIT Verlag is a German academic publisher founded in 1980.  Its managing director is Wilhelm Hopf. Its principal place of publication is Münster; further publishing offices are located in Berlin, Vienna, Hamburg, London, Zurich, and New York City. It publishes approximately 800 books per year.  It generally publishes in the areas of theology, social sciences, humanities, economics, political science.

References

Book publishing companies of Germany
1980 establishments in West Germany